Juan Ángel Flores Ascencio (born 25 February 1976 in Lima) is a Peruvian footballer who played as a goalkeeper.

Club career
Juan Flores made his league debut in the Torneo Descentralizado in the 1996 season playing for Ciclista Lima.

References

1976 births
Living people
Footballers from Lima
Association football goalkeepers
Peruvian footballers
Peru international footballers
Ciclista Lima Association footballers
Sport Boys footballers
Club Universitario de Deportes footballers
Estudiantes de Medicina footballers
Juan Aurich footballers
Cienciano footballers
Atlético Minero footballers
Total Chalaco footballers
León de Huánuco footballers
Unión Comercio footballers
Peruvian Primera División players